Brae Bay (previous alternate: Broe Bay) is an Arctic waterway in the Qikiqtaaluk Region, Nunavut, Canada. It is located in Baffin Bay by northern Devon Island. Directly to the north is the Inuit community of Grise Fiord on Ellesmere Island.

References

 Brae Bay, Nunavut at Atlas of Canada

Bays of Qikiqtaaluk Region